The Lovelace Medal was established by the British Computer Society in 1998, and is presented to individuals who have made outstanding contributions to the understanding or advancement of computing. It is the top award in computing in the UK. Awardees deliver the Lovelace Lecture.

The award is named after Countess Ada Lovelace, an English mathematician, scientist, and writer. Lovelace was the daughter of Lord Byron. She worked with computer pioneer Charles Babbage on the proposed mechanical general-purpose computer – the Analytical Engine, in 1842 and is often described as the world's first female computer programmer.

The medal is intended to be presented to individuals, without regard to their countries of domicile, provided a direct connection to the UK. It is generally anticipated that there will be one medalist each year, but the regulation does not preclude either several medalists or no medalist.

Medal recipients
Awardees include:
2020 Ian Horrocks – for significant contributions to the advancements of reasoning systems
2020 Nick Jennings and Michael Wooldridge – for contributions to multi-agent systems
2019 Marta Kwiatkowska – for probabilistic model checking for the data-rich world
2018 Gordon Plotkin – for contributions to semantic framework for programming languages
2017 Georg Gottlob – for contributions to the logical and theoretical foundations of databases
2016 Andrew Blake – for contributions to the understanding and advancement of computing as a discipline
2015 Ross Anderson – for contributions to building security engineering into a discipline
2014 Steve Furber – for designing the ARM microprocessor architecture and contributions to computer systems
2013 Samson Abramsky – for contributions to domain theory, game semantics and categorical quantum mechanics
2012 Grady Booch  – for contributions to software architecture, software engineering and collaborative environments
2011 Hermann Hauser– for entrepreneurship and for co-developing the BBC Micro Computer
2010 John C. Reynolds –  for contributions to logical foundations of programs and programming languages
2009 Yorick Wilks – for contributions to meaning-based understanding of natural language
2008 Tony Storey – for contributions to Autonomic Computing
2007 Karen Spärck Jones – for contributions to natural language processing
2006 Sir Tim Berners-Lee – for inventing the World Wide Web
2005 Nick McKeown – for contributions to router hardware design
2004 John Warnock of Adobe Systems – for contributions in document processing
2002 Ian Foster and Carl Kesselman – for contributions to grid computing
2001 Douglas C. Engelbart – for inventing the computer mouse
2000 Linus Torvalds – for creating the Linux kernel operating system
1998 Michael A. Jackson and Chris Burton – for program design and structured programming

See also
 List of computer science awards
 Ada Lovelace Award

References

External links
 

1998 establishments in the United Kingdom
Awards established in 1998
Computer science awards
British science and technology awards
British Computer Society